Marumba fenzelii is a species of moth of the family Sphingidae. It is known from China.

Subspecies
Marumba fenzelii fenzelii (Shaanxi and Sichuan in China)
Marumba fenzelii connectens Mell, 1939 (Shanxi in China)

References

Marumba
Moths described in 1937